Kris Lynsey Britt (born 13 April 1984) is an Australian former cricketer.  She debuted for the Australian women's cricket team in 2002 in the second test against England in Sydney, becoming the 144th woman to play Test cricket for Australia. She played 17 One Day Internationals and two Twenty20 Internationals for the Australian women's team, and was the 96th woman to play One Day International cricket for Australia.

Britt began her domestic cricket career with the South Australian Scorpions in 2001, and was their player of the year in 2006/2006. She started playing with the ACT Meteors in 2009. and went on to captain the side in the Women's National Cricket League.

References

External links

Kris Britt at Cricket Australia

1984 births
ACT Meteors cricketers
Australia women One Day International cricketers
Australia women Twenty20 International cricketers
Australia women Test cricketers
Cricketers from the Australian Capital Territory
Living people
Melbourne Renegades (WBBL) cricketers
South Australian Scorpions cricketers
Sportspeople from Canberra